July 7 - Eastern Orthodox Church calendar - July 9

All fixed commemorations below are celebrated on July 21 by Old Calendar.

For July 8th, Orthodox Churches on the Old Calendar commemorate the Saints listed on June 25.

Saints
 Hieromartyr Epictetus, Priest, and Monk-martyr Astion, at Halmyris in Scythia Minor (Romania) (290)
 Great-martyr Procopius of Caesarea in Palestine, and with him (303): 
  Martyrs Theodosia (his mother), tribunes Antiochus and Nicostratus, martyrs Abdias and Sabbas, and twelve women of senatorial rank, all by the sword.
 Martyr Mirdat, King of Kartli, Georgia (410)

Pre-Schism Western saints
 Saints Aquila and Priscilla, a Christian missionary married couple described in the New Testament (Acts 18:3, Rom. 16:3-4) (1st century)  (see also: February 13, July 14)
 Saint Auspicius of Trier, the fourth Bishop of Trier in Germany and successor of St Maternus (c. 130)
 Saint Apollonius, Bishop of Benevento in Italy (c. 326)
 Saints Sostratus, Spirus, Eraclius, Eperentius and Cecilia, martyrs of Syrmium in Pannonia (4th century)
 Saint Morwenna, patroness of Morwenstow, England (5th or 6th century) (see also July 5 )
 Saint Urith of Chittlehampton (Hieritha), a nun martyred by pagan English invaders at Chittlehampton in Devon (6th century?)
 Saints Kilian (Chilianus), Colman and Totnan, monks from Ireland, Enlighteners of Franconia and East Thuringia, where they were martyred (c. 689)
 Saint Landrada of Austrasia, foundress and first Abbess of Munsterbilsen in Belgium (c. 690)
 Saint Withburgh of East Anglia (Withburga), an anchoress at East Dereham, Norfolk, England (c. 743)
 Saint Arnold of Arnoldsweiler, a charitable Greek musician at the court of Charlemagne (c. 800)
 Blessed Edgar the Peaceful, King of Mercia and Northumbria, and upon the death of his brother Eadwig (A.D. 959), King of all England (975)
 Saint Grimbald, monk at St. Bertin Abbey in Saint-Omer in Flanders, invited by King Alfred the Great to help restore scholarship in England, Abbot of Winchester(901)
 Virgin-martyr Sunniva (Sunnifa) and companions, on Selje Island, Norway (10th century)

Post-Schism Orthodox saints
 Saint Procopius of Ustyug, Fool-for-Christ, Wonderworker of Ustiug, Vologda (1303)
 Venerable Theophilus the Myrrh-gusher of Pantocrator Monastery on Mount Athos (1548) 
 Righteous Procopius, Fool-for-Christ, of Ustya, Vologda (c. 1600)
 New Hieromartyr Anastasius of Saint Blaise in Hegumenitsa, Priest, of Constantinople (1743)

New martyrs and confessors
 New Hieromartyrs Alexander Popov, Theodore Raspopov, and Nikolai Bryantsev, Priests (1918)
 New Hieromartyr Procopius (Titov), Archbishop of Kherson (1937)  (see also: November 10 )

Icons
 Miracle of the Annunciation Icon of the Mother of God at Ustiug (1290)
 Appearance of the Kazan Icon of the Most Holy Theotokos (1579)
 Reverence list of a "Kazan" Icon of the Most Holy Theotokos, at: 
 Kazan (1579) 
 "Yaroslavl" (1588)
 Moscow (1612)
 "Viazniky" (1624)
 Nizhnelomovskaya (1643)
 Vitebsk (1655)
 "Tobolsk" (1661)
 "Kaplunovka" (1689)
 "Tambov" (1695)
 Shlisselburg (1702) 
 "Penza" (1717)  (see also: August 4)
 Petersburg (1721)
 "Peschanka" / "Peschanskaya" (1754)  
 "Chimeev" (1770)
 "Vysochinovsky" (18th century)
 "Vyshensky" (1812)
 "Jacobshtad" Icon of the Most Holy Theotokos (17th century)
 Icon of the Most Holy Theotokos Weeping "Umileniye" ("Of Tender Feeling") of Novgorod.
 Icon of the Mother of God "Our Lady of Sitka", Alaska (1850)

Other commemorations
 Translation of the relics (1779) of St. Demetrius of Basarabov, Bulgaria, to Bucharest (1685)
 Slaying of Anastasia Strogilos on the Mount of Olives (1995)
 Synaxis of All Military Saints of the Orthodox Church (2019)

Icon gallery

Notes

References

Sources
 July 8/July 21. Orthodox Calendar (PRAVOSLAVIE.RU).
 July 21 / July 8. HOLY TRINITY RUSSIAN ORTHODOX CHURCH (A parish of the Patriarchate of Moscow).
 July 8. OCA - The Lives of the Saints.
 July 8. The Year of Our Salvation - Holy Transfiguration Monastery, Brookline, Massachusetts. 
 The Autonomous Orthodox Metropolia of Western Europe and the Americas (ROCOR). St. Hilarion Calendar of Saints for the year of our Lord 2004. St. Hilarion Press (Austin, TX). p. 50.
 The Eighth Day of the Month of July. Orthodoxy in China.
 July 8. Latin Saints of the Orthodox Patriarchate of Rome.
 The Roman Martyrology. Transl. by the Archbishop of Baltimore. Last Edition, According to the Copy Printed at Rome in 1914. Revised Edition, with the Imprimatur of His Eminence Cardinal Gibbons. Baltimore: John Murphy Company, 1916. pp. 199–200.
 Rev. Richard Stanton. A Menology of England and Wales, or, Brief Memorials of the Ancient British and English Saints Arranged According to the Calendar, Together with the Martyrs of the 16th and 17th Centuries. London: Burns & Oates, 1892. pp. 324–328.
Greek Sources
 Great Synaxaristes:  8 ΙΟΥΛΙΟΥ. ΜΕΓΑΣ ΣΥΝΑΞΑΡΙΣΤΗΣ.
  Συναξαριστής. 8 Ιουλίου. ECCLESIA.GR. (H ΕΚΚΛΗΣΙΑ ΤΗΣ ΕΛΛΑΔΟΣ). 
  ΙΟΥΛΙΟΣ. Αποστολική Διακονία της Εκκλησίας της Ελλάδος (Apostoliki Diakonia of the Church of Greece).
  08/07/2018. Ορθόδοξος Συναξαριστής. 
Russian Sources
  21 июля (8 июля). Православная Энциклопедия под редакцией Патриарха Московского и всея Руси Кирилла (электронная версия). (Orthodox Encyclopedia - Pravenc.ru).
  8 июля по старому стилю / 21 июля по новому стилю. Русская Православная Церковь - Православный церковный календарь на 2018 год.
  8 июля (ст.ст.) 21 июля 2014 (нов. ст.). Русская Православная Церковь Отдел внешних церковных связей. (DECR).

July in the Eastern Orthodox calendar